The Jester and the Queen is a 1987 Czechoslovak comedy film directed by Věra Chytilová.

External links
 

1987 comedy films
1987 films
1980s Czech-language films
Czechoslovak comedy films
Films directed by Věra Chytilová
Czech comedy films
1980s Czech films